The Dawn and Drew Show is a podcast starring and produced by a married couple, Dawn Miceli (born in West Allis, Wisconsin) and Drew Domkus (formerly of the Scaterd Few).

The hosts describe themselves as "[…] two ex gutter punks who fall in love, buy a retired farm in Wisconsin (then move to Costa Rica and back) and tell the world their dirty secrets… Always profane, rarely profound."

Host biographies
Dawn and Drew live with many pets including dogs, a cat, and a sugar glider. The couple used to own Echo Books and Chocolate Lounge in Playa Cocles, Costa Rica. They moved back to their farmhouse in Wayne, Wisconsin after being robbed and nearly killed in their home in Playa Cocles, Costa Rica. While they regroup and work up a game plan, Dawn Miceli continues to tour with the band Rasputina while Drew tries to learn how to make iPhone apps.

Show format
The shows are spontaneous, although some trends have developed. These often entail Dawn singing, or the signature sign-off, "Good night, Inkernet." Dawn will often tell a peculiar story; Drew often comments on these stories, getting Dawn sidetracked, at which point Dawn emasculates Drew. Listeners are invited to call their audio comment line at (206) 666-3825 (which, on an alphanumeric touchtone phone, spells the oft-mentioned "MOM-FUCK"), to leave a voice message, and these messages are then played at the end of each show. Family members of both hosts have made appearances on the show.

Mevio negotiations
Their show was one of the first to become part of Adam Curry's PodShow network, which at one point carried Dawn and Drew over Sirius Satellite Radio.  In September 2008, on show 800, Dawn and Drew revealed that contract renegotiations with Mevio (formerly PodShow) fell through, and were going to be independent. Without warning, Mevio shut off access to their webserver.

D&D Productions
In 2010, Dawn and Drew's production company, D&D Productions, produced the concert/tour video Under the Corset directed by Dawn about the band Rasputina.

In 2014, Dawn directed Unmasked!, a touring video about the band Captured! by Robots.

Academy of Podcasters Hall of Fame
Dawn and Drew have been announced as inductees into the 2016 Academy of Podcasters Hall of Fame.

References

Further reading
Park City Daily News
Podcasting Bible 
Voice: Vocal Aesthetics in Digital Arts and Media. pp. 39–41.

External links
 The Dawn and Drew Show website
 Drew's blog

Audio podcasts
2004 podcast debuts